Santa Claus is a city in Toombs County, Georgia, United States. The population was 165 at the 2010 census. It is part of the Vidalia Micropolitan Statistical Area.

The city has several Christmas-themed street names: Candy Cane Road, December Drive, Rudolph Way, Dancer Street, Prancer Street, and Sleigh Street.

History
A local entrepreneur named the community after Santa Claus, the Christmas character, with the aim of attracting tourists to his pecan business and adjacent motel. Santa Claus was incorporated as a city in 1941.

Geography

Santa Claus is located at  (32.170863, -82.331129).  It is just off U.S. Route 1.

According to the United States Census Bureau, the city has a total area of 0.2 square mile (0.5 km), all land.

Demographics

As of the census of 2000, there were 250 people, 92 households, and 66 families residing in the city. The racial makeup of the city was 82.28% White, 1.69% African American, 16.03% from other races. Hispanic or Latino of any race were 24.89% of the population.

There were 79 households, out of which 31.6% had children under the age of 18 living with them, 48.1% were married couples living together, 12.7% had a female householder with no husband present, and 32.9% were non-families. 21.5% of all households were made up of individuals, and 1.3% had someone living alone who was 65 years of age or older. The average household size was 3.00 and the average family size was 3.06.

In the city, the population was spread out, with 22.4% under the age of 18, 17.7% from 18 to 24, 28.7% from 25 to 44, 24.9% from 45 to 64, and 6.3% who were 65 years of age or older. The median age was 30 years. For every 100 females, there were 119.4 males. For every 100 females age 18 and over, there were 109.1 males.

The median income for a household in the city was $28,750, and the median income for a family was $32,857. Males had a median income of $27,250 versus $15,750 for females. The per capita income for the city was $13,669. About 13.2% of families and 20.3% of the population were below the poverty line, including 22.5% of those under the age of eighteen and 58.3% of those 65 or over.

See also
 Santa Claus, Arizona
 Santa Claus, Indiana

References

Cities in Georgia (U.S. state)
Santa Claus
Cities in Toombs County, Georgia
Vidalia, Georgia, micropolitan area
1941 establishments in Georgia (U.S. state)
Populated places established in 1941